Tysnes is a local Norwegian newspaper published in Tysnes in Hordaland county.

The newspaper was established in 1953 as a four-page publication. It was originally issued biweekly, but in 1979 it became a weekly publication, appearing every Thursday.

Circulation
According to the Norwegian Audit Bureau of Circulations and National Association of Local Newspapers, Tysnes has had the following annual circulation:
2004: 2,408
2005: 2,412
2006: 2,435
2007: 2,475
2008: 2,511
2009: 2,446
2010: 2,456
2011: 2,419
2012: 2,344
2013: 2,365
2014: 2,323
2015: 2,259
2016: 2,188

References

External links
Tysnes homepage

Newspapers published in Norway
Norwegian-language newspapers
Tysnes
Mass media in Hordaland
Newspapers established in 1953
1953 establishments in Norway
Biweekly newspapers
Weekly newspapers published in Norway